The OBX Index is a stock market index which lists the 25 most liquid companies on the main index of the Oslo Stock Exchange in Norway. All stocks on the OBX list can be traded with options and futures. The companies on the OBX list are rotated twice a year, on the third Friday of June and December.

List of companies in the index

The following 25 companies constitute the OBX list as of the semi-annual review effective 22 June 2020.

History
In 2003 the index showed 100 points. In May 2008 it showed 522 points.

Biggest drop in one day
The worst performing days for the OBX Index are:

See also

List of companies listed on the Oslo Stock Exchange
OSEAX

References

External links
OBX Index page at Oslo Børs website

 OBX Index
Oslo Stock Exchange
Euronext indices